Justice Ellett may refer to:

A. H. Ellett (1898–1986), associate justice of the Utah Supreme Court
Henry T. Ellett (1812–1887), associate justice of the Supreme Court of Mississippi

See also
Justice Elliott (disambiguation)